Saint-Élix-le-Château is a village and commune in the Haute-Garonne department in southwestern France. It is best known for the castle which dominates the village.

Population

The inhabitants of the commune are known as Saint-Élixois.

Geography
The commune is bordered by six other communes: Marignac-Lasclares across the Louge river to the northwest, Lafitte-Vigordane to the northeast, Le Fousseret to the west, Lavelanet-de-Comminges to the southwest, Saint-Julien-sur-Garonne to the south, and finally by Salles-sur-Garonne to the east.

The river Louge flows in the commune, forming a border with the commune of Marignac-Lasclares.

Sights
The Château de Saint-Élix-le-Château is a 16th-century castle which is listed as a historic site by the French Ministry of Culture in 1927, and in 1994, and it is privately owned.

See also
Communes of the Haute-Garonne department

References

Communes of Haute-Garonne